Gable Steveson (born May 31, 2000) is an American professional wrestler and retired freestyle and folkstyle wrestler. He is currently signed to WWE, where he was appointed to the Raw brand under his real name, but has yet to have his debut match. He is the second Olympic wrestling gold medalist to be signed by the company, after Kurt Angle.

In freestyle, Steveson claimed the 2020 Summer Olympic Games gold medal after defeating three-time and reigning World Champion Geno Petriashvili in the final, and defeating defending Olympic champion Taha Akgül earlier in the tournament. He was also the 2021 Pan American Continental champion, and was a three-time age-group World Champion.

As a collegiate wrestler, Steveson was a two-time Dan Hodge Trophy winner, a two-time NCAA Division I National Champion, a three-time Big Ten Conference champion (four-time finalist), and a three-time All-American out of the University of Minnesota. After making a brief appearance at WWE's SummerSlam in 2021, Steveson was signed by the professional wrestling promotion in September where he was drafted to the Raw brand the following month.

Early life 
Steveson was born in Portage, Indiana, where he started wrestling as soon as he could walk, following his two older brother's footsteps. His name Gable Dan was given by his mother after legendary wrestler Dan Gable. After winning multiple youth-level national tournaments, the Steveson family moved to Apple Valley, Minnesota when Gable was in the seventh grade, so he and his brother Bobby could compete for powerhouse Apple Valley High School. As a 13-year old, Steveson reached the 195-pound state finals with a 39–2 record, but was defeated to claim second place, losing his last high school match. After that season, Steveson racked up four state titles and a 171 match win-streak, with his last two state tournaments lasting a combined 28 seconds. In freestyle, Steveson claimed multiple age-group World Championships. The top-recruit, he chose to remain local and attend the University of Minnesota.

Collegiate and freestyle wrestling career

2018–2019 
Steveson, a high school senior, placed fourth at the 2018 US Open Nationals and the US World Team Trials in April and May respectively, beating the likes of NCAA Division I All-American Tanner Hall and fellow Junior World Champion Dom Bradley in the freestyle tournaments.
Steveson started his collegiate wrestling freshman season using a redshirt, winning titles at the Daktronics and Bison Open tournaments. Since his redshirt was pulled in November, he compiled an undefeated 14–0 record in dual meets and a Cliff Keen Invitational title during regular season, with multiple wins over high ranked opponents, most notably second-ranked Derek White in his collegiate debut. Entering the B1G championships as the top-seed, he opened up with a technical fall and two decisions to make it to the finals, where he faced second-seeded Anthony Cassar from Penn State. He lost to Cassar by one point, marking his first defeat in folkstyle since eighth grade. At the 2019 NCAA Division I National Championships, he made it to the semifinals, where he was once again defeated by Cassar by the same 4–3 score. He then won two more matches to claim third place and All-American status.

A recently crowned All-American, Steveson returned to freestyle in May 2019 and became a Final X contestant when he ran through the US World Team Trials Challenge, dismantling 2018 Greco-Roman World finalist Adam Coon, two-time NCAA National champion Tony Nelson, two-time All-American Dom Bradley, and two-time All-American Nick Nevills. However, he lost to two-time World Medalist Nick Gwiazdowski twice by criteria and was unable to make the US World Team.

Steveson then made his international senior debut at the Alexander Medved Prizes in August 2019, where he placed second to Khasanboy Rakhimov. In his last freestyle competition of the year, Steveson added a gold medal to his credit from the Bill Farrell Memorial International in November 2019, after outscoring four opponents 32 points to 4, qualifying for the 2020 US Olympic Team Trials.

2019–2020

Sexual assault allegation & suspension
Steveson's sophomore season was interrupted in June 2019 when he was arrested along with a teammate on suspicion of criminal sexual conduct. Both were released without charges shortly after due to inadequate evidence. However, the University of Minnesota did not lift its suspensions of the two until six months later in December.

Return
After his suspension was pulled and wrestling back to folkstyle, Steveson compiled 12 wins and no losses in duals during regular season, becoming the top-ranked 285-pounder in the United States. Despite being number one in the rankings, Steveson entered the B1G championships as the second seed. At the tournament, he opened up with a fall over the tenth seed, and a decision over the third seed to make it to the finale, where he defeated the top-seeded Mason Parris from Michigan to claim the conference title. Steveson was then scheduled to compete at the NCAA championships as the top-seed, but the event was cancelled due to the COVID-19 pandemic. After the season ended, he was named a first team NCAA Division I All-American due to his performance through the season.

Steveson was slated to compete at the 2020 US Olympic Team Trials in early April 2020. However, the event was postponed for 2021 along with the Summer Olympics due to the COVID-19 pandemic, leaving all the qualifiers unable to compete.

After ten months out of freestyle competition, Steveson wrestled Trent Hillger at the annual Beat The Streets event on September 17, 2020, showing massive skill improvements and winning by technical fall in the first period.

In October 2020, the NCAA granted an extra year of eligibility to winter athletes due to the last season being cut short, this led to Steveson getting an extra year of eligibility.

Steveson represented the Gopher WC at 125 kilograms in the FloWrestling: RTC Cup from December 4 to 5, 2020, alongside graduated Gopher Tony Nelson. After siting out in the dual against the Cliff Keen WC, Steveson faced the heavily accomplished Nick Gwiazdowski from the Wolfpack RTC in an anticipated rematch. He edged the two-time Pan American champion with a score of 4 to 1 points. He then tech'd Jordan Wood to defeat him for the sixth time in freestyle competition and place sixth as a team.

2020–2021 
Competing as a junior during the regular season, he compiled a 9–0 record with a 100 percent bonus rate. During the postseason, he continued his dominance, making his third consecutive Big Ten Championship final and winning his second title, dominating the second-ranked wrestler in the country and '19 Junior World Champion Mason Parris en route to a major decision. At the NCAAs, Steveson compiled two bonus points victories en route to the quarterfinals, where he faced '17 Cadet World Champion from Penn State Greg Kerkvliet, whom he was able to shut down but fell short of bonus points. Later, he major'd the fourth seed from Iowa Tony Cassioppi for the second time in the season and advanced to the finals, where he once again shut down Mason Parris to claim the NCAA National Championship. After the season, the dominant Steveson was awarded the prestigious Dan Hodge Trophy as the best college wrestler of the season, along with Spencer Lee from Iowa.

The newly crowned NCAA champion and Dan Hodge Trophy winner, Steveson went back to freestyle and competed at the rescheduled US Olympic Team Trials from April 2 to 3 as the second seed, in an attempt to represent the United States at the 2020 Summer Olympics. Steveson made his way to the best-of-three with dominant technical falls over two-time US Junior World Team Member Tanner Hall and Cadet World Champion Greg Kerkvliet, before facing 2019 Pan American Games Gold medalist and top-seed Nick Gwiazdowski. In the first match, he racked up another technical fall over the two-time World Championship medalist and NCAA champion and in the second match he once again shut him down, this time by points, winning the championship bouts. This result qualified Steveson to represent the United States at the 2020 Summer Olympic Games. He also warmed up at the Pan American Continental Championships on May 30, dominating all five of his opponents and helping the team sweep all ten freestyle medals.

On August 5, Steveson competed at the first date of the men's freestyle 125 kg event, where he outscored his three high-level opponents with a combined perfect score of 23–0 to secure himself a medal and advance to the finals, demolishing '15 Asian Champion Aiaal Lazarev from Kyrgyzstan, defending Olympic champion and multiple-time World Champion Taha Akgül from Turkey and '19 U23 World medalist Mönkhtöriin Lkhagvagerel from Mongolia. After stunning the field on his way to the finale, he faced three-time and reigning World Champion Geno Petriashvili from Georgia. Onto the second period, Steveson was up 4–0 with two takedowns, though the Georgian scored two points of his own to Steveson's one to make it 5–2, before truly turning the tables and scoring a takedown and two gut-wrenches for six points (5–8) with a minute and a half left. With ten seconds left, Steveson scored a takedown to make it 7–8, and still trailing behind by a point, he rallied and got another takedown with half a second left to top the World Champion with a 9–8 score. After a failed challenge by Petriashvili's corner, Steveson earned the 2020 Summer Olympic Games gold medal with a hard-fought 10–8 score over the Georgian. With this new championship, Steveson became the first American super-heavyweight to win freestyle Olympic gold since Bruce Baumgartner in 1992.

As an Olympic medalist, Steveson earned the right to automatically represent the United States at the 2021 World Championships without having to compete domestically to make the US World Team. On August 15, 2021, Steveson notified USA Wrestling that he would reject the bid in order to pursue other ventures.

2021–2022 
In September 2021, it was announced that despite Steveson signing with WWE, he would return to college wrestling under an NIL deal. Steveson ran through regular season and swept the B1G Championship not short of bonus points, earning his third and last conference title with a 13–0 record.

At the 2022 NCAA Division I National Championships, Steveson started off with two technical falls, before defeating Northwestern's Lucas Davison and Penn State's Greg Kerkvliet by decision to cruise to the finals. In the finale, he defeated previously unbeaten in the season Cohlton Schultz from Arizona State University, six points to two. After the win, Steveson gave his last signature backflip in a Minnesota singlet and, in an emotional moment, left his shoes on the center of the mat as a sign of respect for the sport and signaling retirement from amateur wrestling, followed by a standing ovation by the crowd. After the tournament, Steveson was named the most outstanding wrestler.

Steveson went out as one of the greatest and most dominant collegiate wrestlers in the history of the sport, as a Dan Hodge Trophy winner, two-time NCAA Division I National champion and three-time Big Ten Conference champion.

Professional wrestling career 
In late 2020, Steveson said pursuing a career in WWE as a professional wrestler in order to become a superstar is "a dream I've had since I was a kid". Prior to the Tokyo Olympics in 2021, Steveson signed a Name, Image and Likeness (NIL) marketing deal with MMA manager Dave Martin. After winning the Olympic gold medal, Steveson gained massive notoriety on social media, and teased the public on whether he would continue wrestling or pursue a career in mixed martial arts or professional wrestling next. Steveson then made a brief appearance at WWE's SummerSlam event on August 21, 2021, and then on September 4, it was announced that Steveson had reportedly signed a contract with WWE. Five days later, WWE confirmed they had signed Steveson to an NIL (Next In Line) deal. Steveson is only the second Olympic gold medalist to be signed by the company, after Kurt Angle. During a July 2022 interview, former WWE star Mr. Kennedy confirmed he is training Steveson.

As part of the 2021 WWE Draft, a storyline process in which the company assigns the wrestlers to exclusively appear on a certain show, Steveson was drafted to the Raw brand, which became effective October 22, 2021. Steveson would make his first appearance in April 2022 at WrestleMania 38 Night 1, being introduced by Stephanie McMahon. At WrestleMania Night 2, Steveson confronted Chad Gable after the opening match and delivered a suplex to him.

Freestyle record 

! colspan="7"| Senior Freestyle Matches
|-
!  Res.
!  Record
!  Opponent
!  Score
!  Date
!  Event
!  Location
|-
! style=background:white colspan=7 |
|-
|Win
|34–6
|align=left| Geno Petriashvili
|style="font-size:88%"|10–8
|style="font-size:88%" rowspan=4|August 5–6, 2021
|style="font-size:88%" rowspan=4|2020 Summer Olympics
|style="text-align:left;font-size:88%;" rowspan=4|
 Tokyo, Japan
|-
|Win
|33–6
|align=left| Mönkhtöriin Lkhagvagerel
|style="font-size:88%"|5–0
|-
|Win
|32–6
|align=left| Taha Akgül
|style="font-size:88%"|8–0
|-
|Win
|31–6
|align=left| Aiaal Lazarev
|style="font-size:88%"|TF 10–0
|-
! style=background:white colspan=7 |
|-
|Win
|30–6
|align=left| Aly Barghout
|style="font-size:88%"|TF 10–0
|style="font-size:88%" rowspan=5|May 30, 2021
|style="font-size:88%" rowspan=5|2021 Pan American Continental Championships
|style="text-align:left;font-size:88%;" rowspan=5| Guatemala City, Guatemala
|-
|Win
|29–6
|align=left| Eduardo Garcia
|style="font-size:88%"|TF 10–0
|-
|Win
|28–6
|align=left| Aly Barghout
|style="font-size:88%"|TF 10–0
|-
|Win
|27–6
|align=left| Santiago Restrepo
|style="font-size:88%"|TF 10–0
|-
|Win
|26–6
|align=left| Christian Chajón
|style="font-size:88%"|TF 10–0
|-
! style=background:white colspan=7 |
|-
|Win
|25–6
|align=left| Nick Gwiazdowski
|style="font-size:88%"|10–4
|style="font-size:88%" rowspan=4|April 2–3, 2021
|style="font-size:88%" rowspan=4|2020 US Olympic Team Trials
|style="text-align:left;font-size:88%;" rowspan=4| Fort Worth, Texas
|-
|Win
|24–6
|align=left| Nick Gwiazdowski
|style="font-size:88%"|TF 10–0
|-
|Win
|23–6
|align=left| Greg Kerkvliet
|style="font-size:88%"|TF 11–0
|-
|Win
|22–6
|align=left| Tanner Hall
|style="font-size:88%"|TF 11–0
|-
! style=background:white colspan=7 |
|-
|Win
|21–6
|align=left| Jordan Wood
|style="font-size:88%"|TF 10–0
|style="font-size:88%" rowspan=2|December 4–5, 2020
|style="font-size:88%" rowspan=2|FloWrestling RTC Cup
|style="text-align:left;font-size:88%;" rowspan=2|
 Austin, Texas
|-
|Win
|20–6
|align=left| Nick Gwiazdowski
|style="font-size:88%"|4–1
|-
|Win
|19–6
|align=left| Trent Hillger
|style="font-size:88%"|TF 11–0
|style="font-size:88%"|September 17, 2020
|style="font-size:88%"|2020 Beat The Streets
|style="text-align:left;font-size:88%;" |
 New York City, New York
|-
! style=background:white colspan=7 |
|-
|Win
|18–6
|align=left| Dom Bradley
|style="font-size:88%"|4–1
|style="font-size:88%" rowspan=4|November 15–16, 2019
|style="font-size:88%" rowspan=4|2019 Bill Farrell Memorial International
|style="text-align:left;font-size:88%;" rowspan=4|
 New York City, New York
|-
|Win
|17–6
|align=left| Youssif Hemida
|style="font-size:88%"|7–3
|-
|Win
|16–6
|align=left| AJ Nevills
|style="font-size:88%"|TF 10–0
|-
|Win
|15–6
|align=left| Jeremy Benton
|style="font-size:88%"|TF 11–0
|-
! style=background:white colspan=7 |
|-
|Loss
|14–6
|align=left| Khasanboy Rakhimov
|style="font-size:88%"|TF 0–12
|style="font-size:88%" rowspan=3|August 9–11, 2019
|style="font-size:88%" rowspan=3|2019 Alexander Medved Prizes Ranking Series
|style="text-align:left;font-size:88%;" rowspan=3|
 Minsk, Belarus
|-
|Win
|14–5
|align=left| Jordan Wood
|style="font-size:88%"|TF 10–0
|-
|Win
|13–5
|align=left| Aleksander Kosenkov
|style="font-size:88%"|TF 10–0
|-
! style=background:white colspan=7 |
|-
|Loss
|12–5
|align=left| Nick Gwiazdowski
|style="font-size:88%"|3–3
|style="font-size:88%" rowspan=2|June 7–8, 2019
|style="font-size:88%" rowspan=2|2019 Final X: Rutgers
|style="text-align:left;font-size:88%;" rowspan=2|
 New Brunswick, New Jersey
|-
|Loss
|12–4
|align=left| Nick Gwiazdowski
|style="font-size:88%"|4–4
|-
|Win
|12–3
|align=left| Adam Coon 
|style="font-size:88%"|8–1
|style="font-size:88%" rowspan=5|May 17–19, 2019
|style="font-size:88%" rowspan=5|2019 US World Team Trials Challenge Tournament
|style="text-align:left;font-size:88%;" rowspan=5|
 Raleigh, North Carolina
|-
|Win
|11–3
|align=left| Adam Coon 
|style="font-size:88%"|TF 13–3
|-
|Win
|10–3
|align=left| Tony Nelson 
|style="font-size:88%"|5–1
|-
|Win
|9–3
|align=left| Dom Bradley 
|style="font-size:88%"|7–3
|-
|Win
|8–3
|align=left| Nick Nevills 
|style="font-size:88%"|TF 10–0
|-
! style=background:white colspan=7 |
|-
|Loss
|7–3
|align=left| Tony Nelson
|style="font-size:88%"|4–4
|style="font-size:88%" rowspan=3|May 18–20, 2018
|style="font-size:88%" rowspan=3|2018 US World Team Trials Challenge
|style="text-align:left;font-size:88%;" rowspan=3|
 Rochester, Minnesota
|-
|Win
|7–2
|align=left| Dom Bradley
|style="font-size:88%"|5–4
|-
|Win
|6–2
|align=left| Tanner Hall
|style="font-size:88%"|TF 15–2
|-
! style=background:white colspan=7 |
|-
|Loss
|5–2
|align=left| Dom Bradley
|style="font-size:88%"|2–2
|style="font-size:88%" rowspan=7|April 24–28, 2018
|style="font-size:88%" rowspan=7|2018 US Open Championships
|style="text-align:left;font-size:88%;" rowspan=7|
 Las Vegas, Nevada
|-
|Win
|5–1
|align=left| Tanner Hall
|style="font-size:88%"|TF 11–0
|-
|Win
|4–1
|align=left| Mike Kosoy
|style="font-size:88%"|9–0
|-
|Win
|3–1
|align=left| Zachery Roseberry
|style="font-size:88%"|TF 11–0
|-
|Loss
|2–1
|align=left| Adam Coon
|style="font-size:88%"|TF 0–11
|-
|Win
|2–0
|align=left| Shawn Streck
|style="font-size:88%"|TF 14–0
|-
|Win
|1–0
|align=left| Dominic Balmer
|style="font-size:88%"|TF 10–0
|-

NCAA record 

! colspan="8"| NCAA Division I Matches
|-
!  Res.
!  Record
!  Opponent
!  Score
!  Date
!  Event
|-
! style=background:lighgrey colspan=6 |Start of 2021–2022 Season (senior year)
|-
! style=background:lighgrey colspan=6 |End of 2020–2021 Season (junior year)
|-
! style=background:white colspan=6 |2021 NCAA Championships  at 285 lbs
|-
|Win
|67–2
|align=left| Mason Parris
|style="font-size:88%"|8–4
|style="font-size:88%" rowspan=5|March 18–20, 2021
|style="font-size:88%" rowspan=5|2021 NCAA Division I National Championships
|-
|Win
|66–2
|align=left| Tony Cassioppi
|style="font-size:88%"|MD 16–6
|-
|Win
|65–2
|align=left| Greg Kerkvliet
|style="font-size:88%"|9–4
|-
|Win
|64–2
|align=left| Wyatt Hendrickson
|style="font-size:88%"|TF 17–2
|-
|Win
|63–2
|align=left| Taye Ghadiali
|style="font-size:88%"|Fall
|-
! style=background:white colspan=6 |2021 Big Ten Conference  at 285 lbs
|-
|Win
|62–2
|align=left| Mason Parris
|style="font-size:88%"|MD 12–4
|style="font-size:88%" rowspan=3|March 6–7, 2021
|style="font-size:88%" rowspan=3|2021 Big Ten Conference Championships
|-
|Win
|61–2
|align=left| Christian Lance
|style="font-size:88%"|INJ
|-
|Win
|60–2
|align=left| Tate Orndorff
|style="font-size:88%"|TF 19–4
|-
|Win
|59–2
|align=left| Jack Heyob
|style="font-size:88%"|TF 16–1
|style="font-size:88%"|February 21, 2021
|style="font-size:88%"|Northwestern - Minnesota Dual
|-
|Win
|58–2
|align=left| Peter Christensen
|style="font-size:88%"|Fall
|style="font-size:88%"|February 12, 2021
|style="font-size:88%"|Minnesota - Wisconsin Dual
|-
|Win
|57–2
|align=left| Luke Luffman
|style="font-size:88%"|Fall
|style="font-size:88%"|February 5, 2021
|style="font-size:88%"|Illinois - Minnesota Dual
|-
|Win
|56–2
|align=left| Boone McDermott
|style="font-size:88%"|TF 17–2
|style="font-size:88%" rowspan=2|January 31, 2021
|style="font-size:88%"|Minnesota - Rutgers Dual
|-
|Win
|55–2
|align=left| Jamarcus Grant
|style="font-size:88%"|TF 24–8
|style="font-size:88%"|Minnesota - Purdue Dual
|-
|Win
|54–2
|align=left| Tony Cassioppi
|style="font-size:88%"|MD 14–6
|style="font-size:88%"|January 22, 2021
|style="font-size:88%"|Iowa - Minnesota Dual
|-
|Win
|53–2
|align=left| Brad Wilton
|style="font-size:88%"|TF 23–8
|style="font-size:88%" rowspan=2|January 16, 2021
|style="font-size:88%"|Minnesota - Michigan State Dual
|-
|Win
|52–2
|align=left| Connor Bowes
|style="font-size:88%"|Fall
|style="font-size:88%"|Maryland - Minnesota Dual
|-
|Win
|51–2
|align=left| Christian Lance
|style="font-size:88%"|TF 23–8
|style="font-size:88%"|January 8, 2021
|style="font-size:88%"|Minnesota - Nebraska Dual
|-
! style=background:lighgrey colspan=6 |Start of 2020–2021 Season (junior year)
|-
! style=background:lighgrey colspan=6 |End of 2019–2020 Season (sophomore year)
|-
! style=background:white colspan=6 |2020 Big Ten Championships  at 285 lbs
|-
|Win
|50–2
|align=left| Mason Parris
|style="font-size:88%"|8–6
|style="font-size:88%" rowspan=3|March 7–8, 2020
|style="font-size:88%" rowspan=3|2020 Big Ten Conference Championships
|-
|Win
|49–2
|align=left| Tony Cassioppi
|style="font-size:88%"|9–4
|-
|Win
|48–2
|align=left| Alex Esposito
|style="font-size:88%"|Fall
|-
|Win
|47–2
|align=left| Christian Lance
|style="font-size:88%"|MD 19–7
|style="font-size:88%"|February 21, 2020
|style="font-size:88%"|Nebraska - Minnesota Dual
|-
|Win
|46–2
|align=left| Tony Cassioppi
|style="font-size:88%"|7–5
|style="font-size:88%"|February 15, 2020
|style="font-size:88%"|Minnesota - Iowa Dual
|-
|Win
|45–2
|align=left| Seth Nevills
|style="font-size:88%"|MD 13–5
|style="font-size:88%"|February 9, 2020
|style="font-size:88%"|Penn State - Minnesota Dual
|-
|Win
|44–2
|align=left| Brandon Streck
|style="font-size:88%"|Fall
|style="font-size:88%"|February 2, 2020
|style="font-size:88%"|Minnesota - Indiana Dual
|-
|Win
|43–2
|align=left| Thomas Penola
|style="font-size:88%"|TF 25–10
|style="font-size:88%"|January 31, 2020
|style="font-size:88%"|Minnesota - Purdue Dual
|-
|Win
|42–2
|align=left| Gary Traub 
|style="font-size:88%"|MD 13–2
|style="font-size:88%"|January 26, 2020
|style="font-size:88%"|Ohio State - Minnesota Dual
|-
|Win
|41–2
|align=left| Trent Hillger 
|style="font-size:88%"|10–5
|style="font-size:88%"|January 10, 2020
|style="font-size:88%"|Wisconsin - Minnesota Dual
|-
|Win
|40–2
|align=left| Brendan Furman
|style="font-size:88%"|MD 12–3
|style="font-size:88%" rowspan=2|December 30, 2019
|style="font-size:88%"|Minnesota - Cornell Dual
|-
|Win
|39–2
|align=left| Jonah Niesenbaum
|style="font-size:88%"|Fall
|style="font-size:88%"|Duke - Minnesota Dual
|-
|Win
|38–2
|align=left| Will Hilliard 
|style="font-size:88%"|Fall
|style="font-size:88%" rowspan=2|December 29, 2019
|style="font-size:88%"|Old Dominion - Minnesota Dual
|-
|Win
|37–2
|align=left| Jordan Wood 
|style="font-size:88%"|MD 8–0
|style="font-size:88%"|Lehigh - Minnesota Dual
|-
|Win
|36–2
|align=left| Blake Wolters 
|style="font-size:88%"|MD 21–8
|style="font-size:88%"|December 20, 2019
|style="font-size:88%"|Minnesota - South Dakota State Dual
|-
! style=background:lighgrey colspan=6 |Start of 2019–2020 Season (sophomore year)
|-
! style=background:lighgrey colspan=6 |End of 2018–2019 Season (freshman year)
|-
! style=background:white colspan=6 |2019 NCAA Championships  at 285 lbs
|-
|Win
|35–2
|align=left|Jordan Wood
|style="font-size:88%"|4–0
|style="font-size:88%" rowspan=6|March 21–23, 2019
|style="font-size:88%" rowspan=6|2019 NCAA Division I National Championships
|-
|Win
|34–2
|align=left| Youssif Hemida
|style="font-size:88%"|6–2
|-
|Loss
|33–2
|align=left|Anthony Cassar
|style="font-size:88%"|3–4
|-
|Win
|33–1
|align=left| Amar Dhesi
|style="font-size:88%"|MD 11–1
|-
|Win
|32–1
|align=left| Brian Andrews
|style="font-size:88%"|MD 21–8
|-
|Win
|31–1
|align=left| Zack Parker
|style="font-size:88%"|TF 18–3
|-
! style=background:white colspan=6 |2019 Big Ten Championships  at 285 lbs
|-
|Loss
|30–1
|align=left| Anthony Cassar
|style="font-size:88%"|3–4
|style="font-size:88%" rowspan=4|March 9–10, 2019
|style="font-size:88%" rowspan=4|2019 Big Ten Conference Championships
|-
|Win
|30–0
|align=left| Trent Hillger
|style="font-size:88%"|10–4
|-
|Win
|29–0
|align=left| Sam Stoll
|style="font-size:88%"|5–3
|-
|Win
|28–0
|align=left| Christian Colucci
|style="font-size:88%"|TF 21–6
|-
|Win
|27–0
|align=left| Fletcher Miller 
|style="font-size:88%"|TF 20–5
|style="font-size:88%"|February 17, 2019
|style="font-size:88%"|Indiana - Minnesota Dual
|-
|Win
|26–0
|align=left| Youssif Hemida 
|style="font-size:88%"|7–4
|style="font-size:88%"|February 10, 2019
|style="font-size:88%"|Maryland - Minnesota Dual
|-
|Win
|25–0
|align=left| David Jensen 
|style="font-size:88%"|MD 13–5
|style="font-size:88%"|February 8, 2019
|style="font-size:88%"|Minnesota - Nebraska Dual
|-
|Win
|24–0
|align=left| Jacob Aven 
|style="font-size:88%"|MD 16–6
|style="font-size:88%"|February 3, 2019
|style="font-size:88%"|Purdue - Minnesota Dual
|-
|Win
|23–0
|align=left| Trent Hillger 
|style="font-size:88%"|MD 11–2
|style="font-size:88%"|January 25, 2019
|style="font-size:88%"|Minnesota - Wisconsin Dual
|-
|Win
|22–0
|align=left| Conan Jennings 
|style="font-size:88%"|9–5
|style="font-size:88%"|January 20, 2019
|style="font-size:88%"|Minnesota - Northwestern Dual
|-
|Win
|21–0
|align=left| Deuce Rachal 
|style="font-size:88%"|Fall
|style="font-size:88%"|January 18, 2019
|style="font-size:88%"|Minnesota - Illinois Dual
|-
|Win
|20–0
|align=left| Connor Corbin 
|style="font-size:88%"|MD 12–3
|style="font-size:88%"|January 13, 2019
|style="font-size:88%"|Iowa - Minnesota Dual
|-
|Win
|19–0
|align=left| Christian Colucci 
|style="font-size:88%"|TF 17–2
|style="font-size:88%"|January 6, 2019
|style="font-size:88%"|Rutgers - Minnesota Dual
|-
|Win
|18–0
|align=left| FF 
|style="font-size:88%"|FF
|style="font-size:88%" rowspan=2|December 30, 2018
|style="font-size:88%"|Utah Valley - Minnesota Dual
|-
|Win
|17–0
|align=left| Spencer Berthold 
|style="font-size:88%"|Fall
|style="font-size:88%"|Kent State - Minnesota Dual
|-
|Win
|16–0
|align=left| Cory Gillilland-Daniel 
|style="font-size:88%"|Fall
|style="font-size:88%" rowspan=2|December 29, 2018
|style="font-size:88%"|Minnesota - North Carolina Dual
|-
|Win
|15–0
|align=left| Jordan Wood 
|style="font-size:88%"|9–4
|style="font-size:88%"|Lehigh - Minnesota Dual
|-
|Win
|14–0
|align=left| FF 
|style="font-size:88%"|FF
|style="font-size:88%"|December 8, 2018
|style="font-size:88%"|Minnesota - Fresno State Dual
|-
! style=background:white colspan=6 |2018 Cliff Keen Invitational  at 285 lbs
|-
|Win
|13–0
|align=left| Tate Orndorff
|style="font-size:88%"|MD 12–4
|style="font-size:88%" rowspan=5|November 30 - December 1, 2018
|style="font-size:88%" rowspan=5|2018 Cliff Keen Invitational
|-
|Win
|12–0
|align=left| Cory Daniel
|style="font-size:88%"|9–3
|-
|Win
|11–0
|align=left| AJ Nevills
|style="font-size:88%"|MD 15–6
|-
|Win
|10–0
|align=left| John Borst
|style="font-size:88%"|TF 18–3
|-
|Win
|9–0
|align=left| Luke Ready
|style="font-size:88%"|Fall
|-
|Win
|8–0
|align=left| Blake Wolters 
|style="font-size:88%"|TF 18–3
|style="font-size:88%"|November 25, 2018
|style="font-size:88%"|South Dakota State - Minnesota Dual
|-
|Win
|7–0
|align=left| Derek White 
|style="font-size:88%"|8–2
|style="font-size:88%"|November 18, 2018
|style="font-size:88%"|Oklahoma State - Minnesota Dual
|-
! style=background:white colspan=6 |2018 Bison Open  at 285 lbs
|-
|Win
|6–0
|align=left| Tanner Hall
|style="font-size:88%"|SV–1 3–1
|style="font-size:88%" rowspan=3|November 10, 2018
|style="font-size:88%" rowspan=3|2018 Bison Open
|-
|Win
|5–0
|align=left| Daniel Stibral
|style="font-size:88%"|11–6
|-
|Win
|4–0
|align=left| Samuel Erckenbrack
|style="font-size:88%"|TF 20–5
|-
! style=background:white colspan=6 |2018 Daktronics Open  at 285 lbs
|-
|Win
|3–0
|align=left| Rylee Streifel
|style="font-size:88%"|8–4
|style="font-size:88%" rowspan=3|November 4, 2018
|style="font-size:88%" rowspan=3|2018 Daktronics Open
|-
|Win
|2–0
|align=left| Christian Lance
|style="font-size:88%"|12–6
|-
|Win
|1–0
|align=left| Austin Emmerson
|style="font-size:88%"|MD 15–6
|-
! style=background:lighgrey colspan=6 |Start of 2018-2019 Season (freshman year)

Stats 

!  Season
!  Year
!  School
!  Rank
!  Record
!  Weigh Class
!  Win
!  Bonus
|-
|2022
|Senior
|rowspan=4|University of Minnesota
|#1
|
|100.00%
|
|
|-
|2021
|Junior
|#1
|12–0
|100.00%
|87.5%
|-
|2020
|Sophomore
|#1 (DNQ)
|15–0
|100.00%
|73.33%
|-
|2019
|Freshman
|#3 (3rd)
|35–2
|94.59%
|55.26%
|-
|colspan=5 bgcolor="LIGHTGREY"|Career
|bgcolor="LIGHTGREY"|62–2
|bgcolor="LIGHTGREY"|96.88%
|bgcolor="LIGHTGREY"|72.03%

References

External links 
 

2000 births
Living people
African-American sport wrestlers
American male sport wrestlers
Apple Valley High School (Minnesota) alumni
Minnesota Golden Gophers wrestlers
University of Minnesota alumni
Pan American Wrestling Championships medalists
Wrestlers at the 2020 Summer Olympics
Medalists at the 2020 Summer Olympics
Olympic gold medalists for the United States in wrestling
21st-century African-American sportspeople
20th-century African-American sportspeople
People from Apple Valley, Minnesota
Sportspeople from the Minneapolis–Saint Paul metropolitan area